Bear Creek is a stream in the U.S. state of Wisconsin. It is a tributary to Mill Creek.

Bear Creek was so named on account of bears near its course.

References

Rivers of Wisconsin
Rivers of Portage County, Wisconsin
Rivers of Wood County, Wisconsin